The XPW European Championship is a former professional wrestling title defended in Xtreme Pro Wrestling (XPW) and the Frontier Wrestling Alliance (FWA).

The championship was created in 2003 through a working relationship between XPW and the FWA. This was to be the flagship of the working relationship as the title would be defended throughout Europe and would appear on both promotions respective television programmes, however the title's primary home was to be the FWA. Though it was defended in the FWA, the belt itself was never actually seen, due to XPW folding shortly after the tournament final that determined the first champion and keeping the physical championship belt in the United States. Jonny Storm, the winner of the tournament, continued to defend the championship which was supposedly in the briefcase he carried with him around the world until January 2005 when Storm officially vacated and retired the title.

First champion

1.  Zebra Kid, Robbie Brookside, Jonny Storm and Juventuded Guerrera wrestled representing FWA. Psicosis, Simon Diamond, Jerry Lynn and Chris Hamrick wrestled representing XPW.
2.  The match ended in a Double Red Card as both men failed to return to the ring before a 20 count.

Title history

See also

Professional wrestling in the United Kingdom

References

Frontier Wrestling Alliance championships
Xtreme Pro Wrestling championships
Continental professional wrestling championships